Oligodon lacroixi, commonly known as the Lacroix kukri snake, is a species of snake of the family Colubridae.

Geographic range
The snake is found in the provinces of Yunnan and Sichuan, China and in northern Vietnam.

References 

lacroixi
Snakes of Asia
Snakes of China
Snakes of Vietnam
Reptiles described in 1933
Taxa named by Fernand Angel
Taxa named by René Léon Bourret